The Camp Fire Girls books is a series of fiction novels written for children by various authors from 1912 into the 1930s portraying members of the Camp Fire Girls.

Authors 

 E. A. Watson Hyde
 Margaret Penrose
 Harriet Pyne Grove
 Harriet Rietz
 Hildegarde Gertrude Frey (also as Hildegard G. Frey)
 Howard Roger Garis (pseudonym as Marion Davidson)
 Irene Elliott Benson
 Isabel Hornibrook
 Jane L. Stewart
 Julianne DeVries (also as Julian DeVries)
 Margaret Vandercook
 Margaret Love Sanderson
 Samuel E. Lowe (pseudonym as Helen Hart)
 Stella M. Francis
 Amy Ella Blanchard

Chronological list of titles

See also

Scouting in popular culture

References

External links
 Camp Fire in Children's Fiction
 Camp Fire Girls Handy Guide - to help distinguish between reissued titles.
 The Campfire Girls Books at LibriVox (public domain audiobooks)

Book series introduced in 1912
Juvenile series
American young adult novels
Young adult novel series
Novel series